A penumbral lunar eclipse took place on 16 September 2016, the last of three lunar eclipses in 2016.

Visibility 

It was visible from Europe, Africa, Asia and Australia.

Gallery
Progression as seen from Primorsko, Bulgaria

Related eclipses

Eclipses of 2016 
 A total solar eclipse on 9 March.
 A penumbral lunar eclipse on 23 March.
 A penumbral lunar eclipse on 18 August.
 An annular solar eclipse on 1 September.
 A penumbral lunar eclipse on 16 September.

This eclipse is the one of four lunar eclipses in a short-lived series at the descending node of the moon's orbit.

The lunar year series repeats after 12 lunations or 354 days (Shifting back about 10 days in sequential years). Because of the date shift, the Earth's shadow will be about 11 degrees west in sequential events.

Half-Saros cycle
A lunar eclipse will be preceded and followed by solar eclipses by 9 years and 5.5 days (a half saros). This lunar eclipse is related to two partial solar eclipses of Solar Saros 154.

See also 
 March 2016 lunar eclipse, the first 2016 lunar eclipse (penumbral)
 August 2016 lunar eclipse, the second 2016 lunar eclipse (penumbral)
 List of lunar eclipses and List of 21st-century lunar eclipses

References

External links

 
 Hermit eclipse: 23 Mar 2016 - Penumbral Lunar Eclipse
 Penumbral Lunar Eclipse On Sep. 16, 2016 by Giuseppe Donatiello, Oria, Italy
 Penumbral Lunar Eclipse on September 16, 2016  by Mulham Hindi, Makkah, Saudi Arabia

2016-09
2016 in science
September 2016 events